Since the inception of the Indian football league competition, the Indian Super League, in 2014, 24 players have scored three goals (a hat-trick) or more in a single match. The first player to achieve the feat was Brazilian André Moritz who scored three times for Mumbai City in a 5–0 victory over Pune City.

Bartholomew Ogbeche have scored three or more goals four times in the Indian Super League, more than any other player. The fixture between Goa and Mumbai City in 2015, saw both Dudu Omagbemi and Thongkhosiem Haokip score a hat-trick for the home team in 7–0 victory. Colombian Stiven Mendoza became the first player to score multiple hat-tricks. Coro is the only player to score a hat-trick in two consecutive matches, his hat-trick in 7 minutes against Kerala Blasters in December 2017 is the fastest in Indian Super League history.

Hat-tricks 

Note: The results column shows the scorer's team score first

Multiple hat-tricks
The following table lists the number of hat-tricks scored by players who have scored two or more hat-tricks.

Players in bold  are still active in the Indian Super League.

Hat-tricks by nationality
The following table lists the number of hat-tricks scored by players from a single nation.

See also
 List of I-League hat-tricks
 List of Indian Women's League hat-tricks
 List of India national football team hat-tricks

References

Hat-tricks
Indian Super League
Association football player non-biographical articles